"Midnight Blue" is a song by American rock singer-songwriter Lou Gramm, issued as a 7" single in the United States in January 1987 by Atlantic Records. It was the lead-off single from Gramm's debut album, Ready or Not, released in February 1987. An extended remix of the song was available as a 12" single.

Reception

In a contemporary review, Cash Box praised the single as being "riveting" and "triumphant."  Bret Adams has described "Midnight Blue" as "a terrific pop/rock song" on AllMusic. He has claimed that "despite its hit status, it's one of the decade's truly underappreciated singles". Stephen Thomas Erlewine, while reviewing the Foreigner retrospective collection Jukebox Heroes: The Foreigner Anthology (2000), has called the song "the last great single of the album-rock era".

The single peaked at number 5 on the US Billboard Hot 100 and spent five weeks on the top of the Mainstream Rock chart, starting on 14 February 1987. "Midnight Blue" has remained Gramm's highest-charting solo hit to date.

Track listing

Personnel
 Lou Gramm – vocals; producer
 Eddie Martinez – lead guitar
 Bruce Turgon – rhythm guitars
 Stanley Sheldon – bass guitar
 Phil Ashley – keyboards, programming
 Ben Gramm – drums
 Mark Rivera – backing vocals
 Sherryl Marshall – backing vocals
 Cookie Watkins – backing vocals

Technical personnel
 Pat Moran – producer, engineer
 Ted Jensen – mastering engineer (at Sterling Sound, New York)
 Timothy White – cover photography
 Bob Defrin – art direction

Charts

Weekly charts

Year-end charts

See also
 List of Billboard Mainstream Rock number-one songs of 1987

References

1987 debut singles
1987 songs
Atlantic Records singles
Song recordings produced by Pat Moran
Songs written by Bruce Turgon
Songs written by Lou Gramm